William Charles Malley (c. 1868 – June 17, 1908) was an American football player and coach. He played college football for the University of Michigan from 1888 to 1890 and served as the head football coach to Wabash College in 1892.

Playing career
A native of Chicago, Illinois, Malley played tackle and guard for the University of Michigan Wolverines football teams from 1888 to 1890. He was the captain of the 1890 team that finished with a 4–1 record.

Coaching career

Wabash
In 1892 Malley became the head football at Wabash College in Crawfordsville, Indiana. He held that position for one season and his record at Wabash was 1–4.

Michigan
Malley returned to the University of Michigan as an assistant football coach for the 1897 and 1898 Michigan Wolverines football teams.

Later years
Malley graduated from Michigan's law department in 1891 and became employed with the law firm of Moran, Kraus & Mayer. He later went into partnership with Edwin W. Sims, who became the U.S. Attorney in Chicago. His father, John O'Malley, built the first packing house in Chicago. Malley later became an election commissioner in Chicago. In December 1907, the Chicago Daily Tribune reported that Malley, at age 39, was said to be "hopelessly insane." Family difficulties relating to an unhappy marriage were reported to have resulted in a breakdown. He died six months later at age 40.

Head coaching record

References

Year of birth missing
1860s births
1908 deaths
19th-century players of American football
American football guards
American football tackles
Michigan Wolverines football coaches
Michigan Wolverines football players
Wabash Little Giants football coaches
Lawyers from Chicago
Sportspeople from Chicago
Coaches of American football from Illinois
Players of American football from Chicago